Naomi (also "Neomi") Polani (born August 4, 1927) is an Israeli musical director, theater director, singer, producer, actress, and dancer. She is the Israel Prize laureate for Theater and Dance in 2019.

Music career
Polani founded the singing group "HaTarnegolim" ("The Roosters") in 1960, and was in charge of musical and acting direction, and choreography.  The original group included Yehoram Gaon and HaGashash HaHiver.  It was referred to by The Jerusalem Post as "one of the most exciting things that ever happened to Israeli pop. They brought us some of the greatest hits of all times".  Among the group's hits were "The Neighborhood Song," "Everything's Gold," and "My Great Kid Yossi."  Over 30 years later, Polani worked with a new group to create a comeback of the group.

References

1927 births
Israeli music arrangers
Music directors
Israeli theatre directors
20th-century Israeli women singers
Israeli film actresses
Israeli stage actresses
Israeli female dancers
People from Tel Aviv
Living people